Pluto is an unincorporated community in Raleigh County, West Virginia. The elevation is 2,589 feet.

History
The community was named after Pluto from Greek mythology.

A community landmark is the Pluto Missionary Baptist Church, known as the Old Log Church. According to a 1971 column by Shirley Donnelly, the church was established in 1893 on land donated by Jim Meador. The logs from Meador’s property were sawed and hewn by Jesse Harris. The pulpit in the new church was crafted by Gus Samples, local carpenter and joiner.

References 

Unincorporated communities in West Virginia
Unincorporated communities in Raleigh County, West Virginia